Rota ("The Oath") is an early 20th-century Polish poem, as well as a celebratory anthem, once proposed to be the Polish national anthem. Rota'''s lyrics were written in 1908 by activist for Polish independence, poet Maria Konopnicka as a protest against German Empire's policies of forced Germanization of Poles. Konopnicka wrote Rota in 1908 while staying in Cieszyn. The poem was published for the first time in Gwiazdka Cieszyńska newspaper on 7 November. The music was composed two years later by composer, conductor and concert organist, Feliks Nowowiejski.

History
Konopnicka's poem came into being as a protest against the German Empire's oppression and suppression of Polish culture in German-occupied western Poland — lands that from the late 18th century after the Partitions of the Polish-Lithuanian Commonwealth to 1918 were under Prussian — and later, German — rule. During the Prussian and German rule, German political leaders like Otto von Bismarck, Eugen von Puttkammer and thinkers like Edwart Hartmann campaigned for policy of "ausrotten"(German for extermination) of PolesLiterary and Cultural Images of a Nation Without a State: The Case of Nineteenth-century Poland
Agnieszka Barbara Nance
Peter Lang, 2006 page 32 and Rota was written as a reply to this campaign. The word ausrotten was later used by Nazi Germany against Jews, and it meaning means extermination, as   "ausrotten," when used in the context of living things means their complete destruction of those things through killing.Rota was first sung publicly during a patriotic demonstration in Kraków on July 15, 1910, held to commemorate the 500th anniversary of the Polish-Lithuanian victory over the Teutonic Knights at the Battle of Grunwald. The anthem quickly became popular across partitioned Poland. Until 1918, Rota served as the anthem of the Polish Scouting movement. The post-1926 government led by Józef Piłsudski considered several different poems for a national anthem. The political right, which saw the proposed We Are the First Brigade of the Pilsudski legion as partisan and was lackluster on Poland Is Not Yet Lost, proposed "Rota", which was associated with anti-German struggles from the late 19th century, as a national anthem.

During the German occupation of Poland in World War II, on the eve of 11 November 1939 (Polish Independence Day), in Zielonka, a town at the outskirts of Warsaw, the scouts from the Polish Scouting Association put up posters with the text of the poem on the walls of the buildings. In reprisal, German occupying forces carried out an execution of 9 scouts and other inhabitants of the town. The Communists also retained the same national anthem as well as "Rota", making it the official anthem of the 1st Tadeusz Kościuszko Infantry Division.

After 1989 Rota became the official anthem of the Polish People's Party. Until 2003, the melody of the anthem was played by the Gdańsk carillon tower and served as the signature theme of the television stations TVP Poznań and TVP Gdańsk. In 2010 Rota and its author Konopnicka were honored by a special resolution of the Polish Sejm.  It also served as the anthem of the Polish National-Territorial Region. Rota'' is also the official anthem of League of Polish Families political party.

Text and translation

See also
 Oaths of the Polish Army
 Lebensraum
 Expulsion of Poles by Germany
 Germanisation
 Września
 Kulturkampf
 Drzymała's wagon
 Anti-Polonism
 11 listopada

Notes and references

National symbols of Poland
Polish poems
1908 poems
1910 songs
Polish patriotic songs
Articles containing video clips